Batstone is a surname. Notable people with the surname include:

Chris Batstone, American singer
David Batstone (born 1958), American ethics professor
Harry Batstone (1899–1972), Canadian football player